The Skootamatta River is a river in the Lake Ontario drainage basin in Hastings and Lennox and Addington Counties in Ontario, Canada. It flows from Joeperry Lake to join the Moira River in Tweed. The river's name is thought to come from Ojibwa words meaning "burnt shoreline".

Course
It flows south, taking in the right tributary Rainy Creek, and reaches Pearson Lake. The right tributary Killer Creek joins at the lake. It continues south over a small dam, takes in the right tributary Partridge Creek, and arrives in the community of Flinton. The river takes in the right tributary Elzevir Creek, heads southwest under the highway at Actinolite and runs parallel to Highway 37.

History
Until 1908, the river was used to transport logs to sawmills in the Belleville area. At one time, there was a small hydroelectric station on the river near Slave Lake which generated power for a nearby gold mine.

Tributaries
Elzevir Creek
Little Skootamatta Creek (left)
Flinton Creek (left)
Partridge Creek (right)
Skootamatta Lake
Killer Creek
Rainy Creek

Communities
Flinton, Ontario
Actinolite, Ontario

Culture
The river is mentioned several times in Michael Ondaatje's novel The English Patient as a place where Hana, one of the novel's main characters, once lived.
Name of a song sung by the Cobourg, Ontario band Summerhouse on their CD "Summerhouse... In Black"

See also  
List of rivers of Ontario

References

Rivers of Hastings County
Rivers of Lennox and Addington County